The Collection is a compilation album of recordings by Boney M. released by label BMG-Ariola in 1991. 
The Collection was part of BMG's first mid-price CD campaign, the company released many Collections containing back-catalogue material by artists ranging from Modern Talking, Imagination and Amanda Lear to Chuck Berry, Glenn Miller and Elvis Presley. 
The majority of the tracks on this release are taken from 1980 compilation The Magic of Boney M. - 20 Golden Hits, subsequently most of them appear in slightly edited form.
BMG-Ariola France has re-issued this compilation with new artwork as Cristal Collection in 1994 and as Sunny, Daddy Cool, Rivers Of Babylon and L'Essentiel, both in 2001.

Track listing 
"Rivers of Babylon" (Farian, Reyam) - 3:59
 Edited version from The Magic of Boney M. - 20 Golden Hits
"Daddy Cool"  (Farian, Reyam) - 3:25
 Original album version
"Sunny"  (Bobby Hebb) - 3:14
 Edited version from The Magic of Boney M. - 20 Golden Hits
"My Friend Jack" (The Smoke) - 4:31
 Edited album version from The Magic of Boney M. - 20 Golden Hits
"I See a Boat on the River" (Farian, Jay, Rulofs) - 3:03
 Edited version from Fantastic Boney M.
"Brown Girl in the Ring" (Farian) - 3:06
 Edited version from The Magic of Boney M. - 20 Golden Hits
"Mary's Boy Child/Oh My Lord"  (Jester Hairston, Farian, Jay, Lorin) -  4:31
 Edited version from The Magic of Boney M. - 20 Golden Hits
"Bahama Mama" (Farian, Jay) - 3:17
 Oceans Of Fantasy album edit
"I'm Born Again" (Jay, Rulofs) - 3:57
 Edited version from The Magic of Boney M. - 20 Golden Hits
"Oceans of Fantasy" (Kawohl & Towers) - 3:19
 Edited version from The Magic of Boney M. - 20 Golden Hits
"Ribbons of Blue" (Keith Forsey) - 3:04
 Edited version from The Magic of Boney M. - 20 Golden Hits

Personnel
 Liz Mitchell - lead vocals, backing vocals
 Marcia Barrett - lead vocals, backing vocals
 Frank Farian - lead vocals, backing vocals

Production
 Frank Farian - producer

Release history
 1991 Germany: BMG-Ariola 261 670, 616 701.
 1994 France: Cristal Collection BMG-Ariola 74321 0007 208.
 2001 France: L'Essentiel BMG-Ariola 74321 844 902.

References

Sources and external links
 Rate Your Music, detailed discography
 Discogs.com, detailed discography
 [ Allmusic, biography, discography etc.]

Albums produced by Frank Farian
1991 compilation albums
Boney M. compilation albums